Siev or SIEV may refer to:

Suspected Irregular Entry Vessel, operational term used by the Australian Defence Force and Australian Coastwatch
Siev., taxonomic author abbreviation of Johann August Carl Sievers (1762–1795), German-born botanist
W.Siev., taxonomic author abbreviation of Wilhelm Sievers (1860–1921), German geologist and geographer
David Siev, director of the American documentary film, Bad Axe

See also
Sieve, a utensil
SEIV, Space Empires IV, predecessor to Space Empires V